Arctogymnites is a genus of  ammonoid cephalopods from the middle Triassic included in the ceratitid subfamily Beyrichitinae. Related genera include Beyrichites, Frechites, Gymnotoceras, and Salterites

The Treatise Part L, 1957 separates the beyrichitids (Beyrichidae) as an independent family in the Ceratitaceae, separate from the Ceratitidae.  Later (Tozer 1981) they were incorporated into the Ceratitidae as a subfamily.

References 

 Arkell et al. Mesozoic Ammonoidea; Treatise on Invertebrate Paleontology, Part L, Ammonoidea. Geol Soc of America and Univ Kansas press. R. C. Moore (Ed) -- Ceratitaceae, pp L147 -L158
  Classification of E. T. Tozer 1981

Ceratitidae
Ceratitida genera
Middle Triassic ammonites
Fossils of Russia